The name Willard may refer to:

People

Surname
 Aaron Willard (born 1757), Boston industrialist
 Adam Willard, (born 1973), drummer
 Aimee Willard (1974–1996), murder victim
 Alexander Hamilton Willard (1778–1865), member of the Lewis and Clark Expedition
 Alice Willard (1860-1936), American journalist and businesswoman
 Archibald Willard (1836–1918), American painter
 Ashbel P. Willard (1820–1860), American politician, governor of Indiana
 Barbara Willard (1909–1994), British author
 Beatrice Willard (1925–2003), American botanist
 Charity Cannon Willard (1914–2005), American scholar and author
 Charles W. Willard (1827–1880), American politician from Vermont
 Clarence E. Willard (1882-1962), American vaudeville performer
 Cyrus Field Willard (1858–1942), American journalist, political activist, theosophist, and freemason
 Dallas Willard (1935–2013), American philosopher and author
 Dan Willard, American computer scientist and logician
 Daniel Willard (1861–1942), American railroad executive
 Edward Smith Willard (1853–1915), English stage
 Elen Willard (born 1941), American actress
 Emma Willard (1787–1870), American activist and educator
 Frances Willard (suffragist) (1839–1898), American educator, temperance reformer and women's suffragist
 Frances Willard (magician) (born 1940), stage magician
 Fred Willard (1933–2020), American actor
 George Willard (1824–1901), American politician from Michigan
 Horace B. Willard (1825–1900), American politician
 Huntington Willard (born c. 1953), American geneticist
 Jess Willard (1881–1968), American boxer
 Jess Willard (footballer) (1924–2005), English football player and coach
 John Willard (disambiguation), several people:
 John Willard (died 1692), American witchcraft defendant
 John Willard (judge) (1792–1862), American lawyer and politician from New York
 John Willard (playwright) (1885-1942), American 
 John D. Willard (1799–1864), American lawyer and politician from New York
 Joseph Willard (1738–1804), American clergyman and academic
 Joseph A. Willard (1803–1868), American politician from New York
 Josiah Willard (1805–1868), American activist
 Ken Willard (born 1943), American football player
 Kenneth R. Willard (1902–1987), American politician from New York
 Kevin Willard (born 1975), American basketball coach
 Marcel Willard (1889-1956), French politician
 Martin Louis Willard (1842–1921), American politician from New York
 Mary Louisa Willard (1898-1993), American college professor
 Mary Thompson Hill Willard (1805–1892), American social reformer
 Nancy Willard (born 1936), American author and poet
 Ralph Willard (born 1946), American basketball coach 
 Robert F. Willard (born 1950), US Navy officer
 Rod Willard (born 1960), Canadian ice hockey player
 Samuel Willard (1640–1707), American colonial clergyman
 Sidney Willard (1780–1856), American politician from Massachusetts
 Simon Willard (1753–1848), American maker of Simon Willard clocks
 Simon Willard (first generation) (1605–1676), Massachusetts colonist
 Solomon Willard (1783–1861), American stonecarver and builder
 Sylvie Willard (born 1952), French bridge player
 Victor Willard (born 1815), American farmer and politician
 Xerxes Addison Willard (1820–1882), American dairyman, lawyer, and newspaper editor

Given name
 Willard Bartlett (1846–1925), American judge from New York
 Willard Harrison Bennett (1903–1987), American physicist
 Willard Boyle (1924–2011), Canadian physicist
 Willard Brown (1915–1996), American baseball player
 Willard H. Brownson (1845–1935), US Navy officer
 Willard C. Butcher (born 1926), American banker
 Willard S. Curtin (1905–1996), American politician from Pennsylvania
 Willard Dewveall (1936–2006), American football player
 Willard Dyson, American drummer
 Willard R. Espy (1910–1999), American editor, philologist, writer, and poet
 Willard Estey (1919–2002), Canadian judge
 Willard Gemmill (1875–1935), American judge from Indiana
 Willard Hall (1780–1875), American lawyer and politician from Delaware
 Willard Preble Hall (1820–1882), American lawyer and politician, governor of Missouri 
 Willard Hershberger (1910–1940), American baseball player
 Willard Ikola (born 1932), American ice hockey player and coach
 Willard Johnson (politician) (1820–1900), American politician from New York
 Willard F. Jones (1890–1967), Naval engineer and Gulf Oil executive
 Willard Keith (1920–1942), American Marine officer
 Willard Kennedy, better known as Bill Kennedy (actor) (1908–1997), American actor and voice artist
 Willard Libby (1908–1980), American chemist
 Willard Maas (1906–1971), American experimental filmmaker and poet
 Willard Kitchener MacDonald (1906–1971), "the Hermit of Gully Lake" in Canada
 Willard Mack (1873–1934), Canadian-American actor, director, and playwright
 Willard Manus (born 1930), American novelist, playwright, and journalist
 J. Willard Marriott (1900–1985), American businessman
 Willard Marshall (1921–2000), American baseball player
 W. Eugene McCombs (1925–2004), American politician from North Carolina
 Willard Metcalf (1858–1925), American artist
 Willard Mullin (1902–1978), American sports cartoonist
 Willard H. Murray Jr. (born 1931), American politician from California
 Willard Zerbe Park (1906–1965), anthropologist
 Willard Phelps (born 1941), former Yukon politician
 Willard Price (1887–1983), American natural historian and author
 Willard Van Orman Quine (1908–2000), American philosopher and logician
 Willard Richards (1804–1854), leader in the Latter Day Saint movement
 Willard Rockwell (1888–1988), businessman
 Willard Mitt Romney  (born 1947), better known as Mitt Romney, 70th Governor of Massachusetts and Republican Presidential nominee
 Willard Ryan (1890-1962), American football coach
 Willard Saulsbury Jr. (1861–1927), American politician from Delaware
 Willard Saulsbury Sr. (1820–1892), American politician from Delaware
 Willard Scott (born 1934), American journalist
 Willard Cleon Skousen (1913–2006), American author and conservative faith-based political theorist
 Willard Carroll Smith Jr, better known as Will Smith (born 1968), American actor, producer, and rapper
 Willard J. Smith (1910–2000), Commandant of the United States Coast Guard
 Willard Dickerman Straight (1880–1918), American investment banker and diplomat
 Willard Thorp (1899–1992), economist, academic, and presidential advisor
 Willard Saxby Townsend (1895–1957), African-American labour leader
 Willard Van Dyke (1906–1986), American filmmaker and photographer
 Willard Warner (1826–1906), brigadier general in the Union Army during the American Civil War
 W. Garfield Weston (1898–1978), Canadian businessman
 Willard Wheatley (1915–1997), Chief Minister of the British Virgin Islands
 Sir Willard White (born 1946), British bass-baritone
 Willard Wigan (born 1957), British sculptor
 Willard Huntington Wright, better known under his pen name S. S. Van Dine (1888–1939), American art critic and author

Other
 F.D.C. Willard, Siamese cat that coauthored several physics papers between 1975 and 1980.
Surnames from given names

See also
 Descendants of Simon Willard (1605–1676)

English masculine given names
English-language surnames